Newnton is part of the name of two villages in England:

Long Newnton, Gloucestershire
North Newnton, Wiltshire